Jacob J. Berner (October 23, 1865 – May 18, 1931) was an American politician who served in the Wyoming Senate as a Democrat.

Life

Jacob J. Berner was born in Altdorf, Kingdom of Württemberg to Conrad Berner and Mary Hahn on October 23, 1865. On August 31, 1880 his family moved to the Wyoming Territory and became ranchers until 1885 and then carpenters until 1900. On March 28, 1893 he married Martha Jane Nagel and later had eight children with her.

Berner was elected as deputy sheriff of Albany county and served from 1897 to 1898. From 1909 to 1911 he served on the board of Albany county commissioners. In 1910 he was elected to the Wyoming Senate and served until 1919 where he served on the judiciary, public buildings and institutions, elections, and immigration committees.

In 1920 he left Laramie, Wyoming and moved to Torrance, California where he died on May 18, 1931 after suffering from an illness for months.

References

External links

1865 births
1931 deaths
19th-century American politicians
20th-century American politicians
German emigrants to the United States
People with acquired American citizenship
People from Laramie, Wyoming
People from Torrance, California
Democratic Party Wyoming state senators